Kebuzone (or ketophenylbutazone) is a nonsteroidal anti-inflammatory drug (NSAID) that is used for the treatment of inflammatory conditions such as thrombophlebitis and rheumatoid arthritis (RA).

References

Ketones
Pyrazolidindiones
Nonsteroidal anti-inflammatory drugs